Anna Rose Patten (born 20 April 1999) is an English footballer who plays as a defender for Aston Villa  in the FA Women's Super League, on loan from Arsenal. She previously played college soccer for the Florida State Seminoles and the South Carolina Gamecocks in the United States and has represented England at multiple youth levels from under-15 up to under-21.

Early life
Patten grew up in Harpenden, England, a commuter town outside London.

A childhood Arsenal fan, Patten joined the Arsenal Academy at 12 years of age.  With the youth sides she won the FA Youth Cup tie, in 2015 & 2016.  she won

After years of development in the academy ranks, Patten made her senior side debut in 2017 aged 18.

College career

Florida State Seminoles 2017–18
In her freshman year at Florida State, Patten made 18 appearances , including 13 starts.  Utilized primarily as a defender and holding midfielder, she tallied two assists during the season.

In her sophomore season she made 12 starts and played in 23 matches.  She scored four goals and made two assists.  Patten and the Seminoles won the 2019 ACC Women's Championship & the 2018 NCAA Division I Women's Soccer Tournament.

South Carolina Gamecocks 2019–20
Patten transferred to the South Carolina Gamecocks as a rising junior. She joined England U21 teammate Grace Fisk at the university who helped with the transfer process. The pair helped the Gamecocks post 15 shutouts in their first 21 matches of the 2019 season. They helped South Carolina to a 2019 SEC-Soccer Championship.  Patten was named the All-SEC second team and made the SEC Academic Honour Roll.

The Southeastern Conference was one of the conferences which opted to play their 2020 NCAA women's soccer tournament in the fall with a reduced 10 game season.  Patten was named captain of the side for the fall campaign.  She played the second most minutes of anyone on the team and was named to the All-SEC First Team.

She graduated with a degree in sociology.

Club career

Arsenal 2017, 2021–
Patten made her senior side debut in a Champion's league match against Bayern Munich in February 2017. She made her league debut in April 2017, during the FA WSL Spring Series.  She went on to play every game of that series.  Patten then departed Arsenal to play college soccer in the United States.

On 17 January 2021 Patten made her second Arsenal debut against Reading in the FA WSL in a game which would end 1–1, in which she played 45 minutes. On 28 February Patten came on for her second game this time against Aston Villa where she played the final ten minutes in a game which would end 4–0 to Arsenal. On 19 March Patten would come on as a substitute again in the league this time against Manchester United for the final four minutes a game in which Arsenal would win 2–0. Patten's fourth appearance would also be as a substitute this time against North London rivals Tottenham Hotspur in game which would finish 3–0 to Arsenal.

On 18 April 2021 Patten would score her first goal for Arsenal in a FA Cup match against Gillingham in a game that would finish 10–0 to Arsenal.

Loan to Aston Villa
It was announced on 4 January 2022 that Patten had joined Aston Villa on loan until the end of the 2021–22 season.

International career

Youth career
Patten has been part of several England youth teams.  She made her first appearance on the U-15 team in 2014.  Two years later Patten was part of the England 2016 FIFA U-17 Women's World Cup which reached the quarterfinals.

In 2018 she was part of the England U20 which finished third at the 2018 FIFA U-20 Women's World Cup in France.

Senior career
Patten has been called in the England senior squad for a number of camps.

References

External links
 Profile at the Football Association website
 Profile at the Florida State Seminoles website
 Profile at the South Carolina Gamecocks website
 
 

1999 births
Living people
English women's footballers
Women's Super League players
Arsenal W.F.C. players
Aston Villa W.F.C. players
Women's association football defenders
Florida State Seminoles women's soccer players
South Carolina Gamecocks women's soccer players
English expatriate sportspeople in the United States
Expatriate women's soccer players in the United States
English expatriate footballers